The Kurrajong railway line was a railway line in the distant rural western suburbs of Sydney, Australia. It was an extension of the branch off the Main Western line from Blacktown to Richmond and was operated by the New South Wales Government Railways.

Construction 
The construction of the railway between Richmond and Kurrajong did not receive Parliamentary authorisation until 1919, by which time roads were being improved to a standard that did not warrant a railway to bring the produce of the area west of the Hawkesbury River to the Sydney market. From its opening in 1926 until its closure in 1952, it remained a minor branch line.

Lobbying for an extension of the Richmond line to Kurrajong began in 1884, but the high cost of bridging the flood-prone Hawkesbury River and the limited amount of agricultural land available delayed construction.

Finally, political lobbying by local landholders paid off and the first sod was turned on 2 June 1923. Regular passenger trains began running on 8 November 1926, although the official opening took place on 20 November 1926.

Route description 
The branch began in the back platform at Richmond and continued across East Market Street on a level crossing which was protected by a station employee with a red flag or red light. It then passed around Richmond Oval, continuing in a north west direction along March Street at the far end of which it left the town centre and entered its own right of way. This dropped through a cutting towards the river on a 1 in 50 grade before making its way across the alluvial soil of the level floodplain. Trains were running to this point by April 1925.

Gravel trains ran from the Nepean Sand and Gravel Siding located just before the line crossed the Old Kurrajong Road. This material was being used in the construction of Sydney Harbour Bridge.

A very short passenger platform was located on the eastern bank of the Hawkesbury river. This opened in 1928 with the misnomer of Nepean Bridge. It was renamed Phillip in 1934. This location was a favourite swimming and picnic spot.

The bridge over the Hawkesbury River for the railway was erected on concrete piers which were an extension of those supporting the adjacent road bridge. Upon leaving the river, the line ascended on a 1 in 36 grade through the western river bank and reached Bells Line of Road which it crossed at a 45° angle and entered North Richmond station.

Upon leaving the station, the railway continued in a straight alignment, largely through the property of farmers. Being classed as a 'pioneer line', the route was unfenced, the rails second-hand and laid on wooden sleepers with ash ballast. Stopping locations were established between North Richmond and Kurrajong at locations which, in 1928, were named Red Cutting, Kemsleys, Thompsons Ridge, Nurri and Duffys. The line through these locations passed orchards and small farms as it slowly climbed into what is the foothills of the Blue Mountains.

Embankments and cuttings were now a feature of the line as it headed towards its terminus. Kurrajong station was located on a site carved from the side of the ridge on which the village is situated. A concrete slab station building stood on the platform. There was a run-round loop and looped goods siding which served a goods shed and hand crane.

Operations 

The regular passenger train on the railway consisted of a Z20-class tank locomotive hauling two carriages. Just like the Camden line, the train was given the nickname of 'Pansy'. The  journey was timed to take between 30 and 35 minutes. Mixed trains were given extra time to allow for the possible need to shunt at North Richmond or the Nepean Gravel siding.

However, trains of up to 5 carriages would run to Kurrajong on public holidays. Phillip station would be well patronised. Bushwalkers would take advantage of the 'halts' between North Richmond and Kurrajong. Often carriages would be detached at Kurrajong, to return on later trains when the patronage was increased. The gravel trains were usually hauled by a D50-class locomotive which could haul 640 tons from the siding.

The speed limit for passenger and mixed was just , with a  limit along March Street and through the park opposite Richmond station. The gravel trains were limited to  respectively.

Safeworking was by means of Ordinary Train Staff, however it was permissible to operate gravel trains between Richmond and the siding whilst the staff was secured at Kurrajong.

Very little freight was handled on the line beyond Hawkesbury River. It was far more convenient for orchardists to use road freight to the Sydney markets as this gave the opportunity for back loading of fertiliser and other farm requisites.

Whilst the line was initially considered a country branch line, from 10 October 1941 it was brought into the Sydney Metropolitan fare scales. This permitted reduced off-peak returns and child weekend excursions.

Closure 
The closing date was not one with the usual advance notice. Heavy rain on the weekend of 12 and 13 June 1952, caused the Hawkesbury River to flood and, as was usual with such occurrences, the railway service was suspended. More flooding followed in the following weeks and a bus had been substituted on the Kurrajong side of the river with a floodboat ferrying passengers across the flooded stream. A cutting near the terminus had collapsed and, despite constant efforts, would not stabilise until prolonged dry weather returned.

Consequently, it was announced that in view of the damage to the line and the fact that the line was never a commercial success, the line would not reopen. Protest meetings occurred, but finally, on 17 September 1952, the newly appointed Commissioner for Railways, Reg Winsor, made the official notification. The total annual income of the line was less than the cost of repairs.

Kurrajong Line stations 

  Richmond
  Phillip
  North Richmond
  Kemsleys
  Thompsons Ridge
  Duffys
  Kurrajong

References

 
 

Closed railway lines in Sydney
Railway lines opened in 1926
Railway lines closed in 1952
Standard gauge railways in Australia
Richmond railway line
1926 establishments in Australia
1952 disestablishments in Australia